Hello Summer may refer to:

Hello Summer, from BoA videography
"Hello Summer", song by Rameez
"Hello Summer", song by Danielle Bradbery from I Don't Believe We've Met